(Arch)Eparchy (-diocese) of Prešov (also: Preszów, Priashiv, Pryashev, Eperjes) may refer to the following ecclesiastical jurisdictions with see at Prešov, Slovakia :

 Eastern Orthodox 
 Orthodox Archeparchy of Prešov and Slovakia, current primatial Metropolitan Archdiocese (initially eparchy = diocese) of the autocephalous Czech and Slovak Orthodox Church.
 Eparchy of Mukacheve and Prešov, former Eastern Orthodox diocese that existed from 1931 to 1945, under ecclesiastical jurisdiction of the Serbian Orthodox Church.

 Eastern Catholic
 Slovak Catholic Metropolitan Archeparchy of Prešov, current Eastern Catholic (Byzantine rite) archdiocese of the Slovak Byzantine Catholic Church.

See also 
 Eparchy of Mukachevo (disambiguation)